Turbonilla isabelitae is a species of sea snail, a marine gastropod mollusk in the family Pyramidellidae, the pyrams and their allies.

Distribution
This species occurs off the Canary Islands and Atlantic Morocco.

References

External links
 To CLEMAM
 To Encyclopedia of Life
 To World Register of Marine Species

isabelitae
Gastropods described in 2000